Robat (also Romanized as Robāţ; also known as Robāţ-e Māhīdasht, Robāţ-e Māhī Dasht, Robaţ ‘Olyā, and Māhīdasht) is a city and capital of Mahidasht District, in Kermanshah County, Kermanshah Province, Iran. It is situated 25 Kms to the southwest of the provincial capital Kermanshah on the main way to Eslamabad-e Gharb on road 48 (Iran).  At the 2006 census, its population was 996, in 248 families.

See also
Kalhor

References

Populated places in Kermanshah County

Cities in Kermanshah Province
Kurdish settlements in Kermanshah Province